Kumar Govind is an Indian actor and director in the Kannada film industry, known for starring in hit films like Shhh! (debut as Hero) and Anuraga Sangama with Ramesh Aravind and Sudha Rani.

Career
Kumar Govind made his acting debut with horror film Sshhh (1993) directed by Upendra for which was also a producer. The film became successful and made him popular. He was also appreciated for his role of innocent Govindu in Anuraga Sangama (1994). Kumar Govind was initially offered the leading role in Om (1995) which did not materialize.

Filmography

Director

Actor
Sshhh (1993)
Raviteja (1998)
Anuraga Sangama (1995)
Kardipura (1998)
Kona Edaithe (1994)
Shravana Sambrama (2002)
Mruthyu Bandana(1998)
Kshama (2002)
Minugu Thare (1996)
Halli Yadarenu Shiva (2002)
Maduve (1997)
Nee Modida Mallige (2002)
Thaayi Kotta Seere (1997)
Ohh Gandasare Neevu Yeshtu Oleyavaru (1998)
Ee Hrudaya Ninagaagi (1997)
Shruti Hakida Hejje (2004)
Nodu Baa Nammoora (1997)                                                                                         
Chandana Chiguru (2005)
Mayabazar (2000)                                                                                                
Nama Samsara Ananda Sagara(2006)
Mahalakshmi (2001)
Amma Nagama (2006)
Jenu Goodu (2001)                                                                                                       
Vande Matharam (2007)
Sri Manjunatha (2001)                                                                                                   
Naranthaka (2006)
Yuvaraja (2001)                                                                                                         
Kanakambari (2008)
Aathma (2002)                                                                                                           
Muthu (2006)
Thaayi (2008)                                                                                                           
Sambrama (2008)
Dubai Babu (2009)                                                                                                       
Preethisi Horatavale (2011)
Sathya (2010)                                                                                                           
Bekku (2011)
Mastermind (2015)                                                                                                       
Mooka nayaka (2016)
Rudra Tandava (2015)                                                                              
Chikka (2007)
Kalyani (2008)

References

External links
 
 Kumar Govind Filmography

Male actors in Kannada cinema
Film producers from Karnataka
Film directors from Karnataka
Indian male film actors
Male actors from Karnataka
20th-century Indian male actors
21st-century Indian male actors
1973 births
Living people